The Rural Municipality of Lake Johnston No. 102 is a rural municipality (RM) in the Canadian province of Saskatchewan within Census Division No. 3 and  Division No. 2. Located in the southwest portion of the province, it is north of the Town of Assiniboia and south of the City of Moose Jaw.

History 
The RM of Lake Johnston No. 102 incorporated as a rural municipality on December 9, 1912.

Geography

Communities and localities 
The following urban municipalities are surrounded by the RM.

Towns
 Mossbank

The following unincorporated communities are within the RM.

Localities
 Ardill, dissolved as a village, December 31, 1972
 Bishopric
 Dunkirk
 Expanse, dissolved as a village, January 1, 1935
 Mitchellton, dissolved as a village, January 1, 1939

Demographics 

Attractions 
Two nearby conservation areas include the Old Wives Lake Bird Sanctuary and the Isle of Bays Wildlife Refuge.

Government 
The RM of Lake Johnston No. 102 is governed by an elected municipal council and an appointed Administrator that meets on the second Tuesday of every month. The reeve of the RM is Sacha Martens while its Administrator is Boyd Holland. The RM's office is located in Mossbank.

See also 
List of rural municipalities in Saskatchewan

References 

Lake Johnston

Division No. 3, Saskatchewan